FIRST LEGO League Explore (FLLE) (formerly known as FIRST LEGO League Jr.) is a non-competitive robotics program designed for children ages six to ten. It is one of the programs established by FIRST.

FIRST LEGO League Explore follows the same theme given to the FIRST LEGO League Challenge. While FIRST LEGO League Challenge teams conduct research projects and design autonomous robots specifically to carry out missions relating to the topic, FIRST LEGO League Explore teams conduct much smaller projects and make models out of LEGO elements to illustrate one part of the theme. They may also use LEGO WeDo, a programmable robotics kit, as part of their models.

Currently, the program is available in 33 countries.

History
FIRST LEGO League Explore started out as a pilot program in 2004 to encourage young children to have interest in science and engineering. In the first pilot year, the teams were provided with some specific LEGO parts by FIRST, but that idea was dropped in later years. Teams now use any LEGO elements that they have to build the models. The pilot years were done in three phases from 2004 to 2006. The program was officially launched in 2007 during the Power Puzzle season.

During the first five years, the program was not referred as a robotic program. The only requirements to build models out of LEGO elements were to have some moving parts and include at least one simple machine based on a given topic of that year. FIRST has provided an option to purchase a FIRST LEGO League Jr. Base Kit that contains many LEGO elements including gears, motor, and other TECHNIC elements. In 2009, with the new robotics kit by LEGO Group, the program included LEGO WeDo as an optional kit which allows children to connect a motor and/or a sensor to other LEGO bricks, gears and other TECHNIC elements. It also has drag-and-drop programming interface for children to write robotics programs.

The number of participants has been increasing each year. However, the program was limited to the United States and Canada until 2009.

Program details
FIRST LEGO League Explore is designed to be a non-competitive and community-based program. The teams are formed within local community and participate in local events. FIRST provides guidelines to help coaches to run their teams and local organizers to run FIRST LEGO League Explore events. However, FIRST does not organize any FIRST LEGO League Jr. event, unlike other FIRST programs.

The program is designed to be flexible; there are no specific dates for the program. Each team may decide when to start the activities and for how long as long as the registration is done within the season calendar which is from August to June each year. A team consists of 2-6 team members. There is an age limit that team members must not be older than 9 as of January 1 of the year the Challenge is released. Although there is no lower bound on age, FIRST suggests that the program is intended for children 6 or older.

After registering a team, the coach guides students to do research by following the Challenge guideline. The team may have a field trip or visit experts to help children to learn more about the topic. Children will then work on their "Show Me" poster and LEGO models to demonstrate their findings according to the instructions in the Challenge. The team may choose to use any LEGO parts that they have at home to construct their models. Optionally, the team may purchase FIRST LEGO League Explore Base Kit or LEGO WeDo Kit to use.

Challenges
The FIRST LEGO League Explore challenges align with the research project portion of the FIRST LEGO League Challenge.

Events

Concept
The program encourages teams to go out and tell their story to others after they have completed the poster and the models. They may participate in one of the well-established FIRST LEGO League Explore events, which are typically part of FIRST LEGO League Challenge tournaments run by independent FIRST LEGO League Challenge partners. Most of these events are called FIRST LEGO League Explore Expos. Alternately, they may host their own event in the neighborhood or at school to showcase their accomplishment.

At the FIRST LEGO League Explore event, there will be "Reviewers" (the judges) to ask children some questions about what they have learned. They may be asked for details about the project and the models that they built. The FIRST LEGO League Explore concept is that everyone is a winner, therefore, the event organizers are recommended to give an award to each team that participates in the event.

Awards
The organizers can create any list of awards. Below is the list of awards suggested by FIRST:
 Amazing Movement Award
 Gracious Professionalism Award
 Against All Odds Award
 Effort and Learning Award
 Complexity and Decoration Award
 Most Explosive Award
 Robust Design Award
 Construction Innovation Award
 Team Spirit Award
 Teamwork Award
 Inquiring Minds

Notable events
Since the inception of the program, FIRST LEGO League Explore events have been held by local organizers or official FIRST LEGO League Explore partners in the participating countries, but not by FIRST headquarters. FIRST holds an annual event called the FIRST LEGO League Explore World Festival Expo each year as part of the FIRST Championship, in Houston, Texas and Detroit, Michigan.

See also
 FIRST
 FIRST Lego League Challenge

References

External links
 

For Inspiration and Recognition of Science and Technology
Robotics events
Lego
2004 in robotics
Recurring events established in 2004